Kunda is a community development block that forms an  administrative division in the Chatra subdivision  of the Chatra district, Jharkhand state, India.

Overview
Chatra district forms a part of the Upper Hazaribagh Plateau, Lower Hazaribagh Plateau and northern scarp. Red laterite acidic soil predominates in an area that is primarily dependent upon rain-fed agriculture. Around 60% of the district is covered with forests. The district has a population density of 275 persons per km2. Around two-thirds of the families in the district live below poverty line. In the extreme south of the district some portions of Tandwa CD Block are part of North Karanpura Coalfield.

Maoist activities
Jharkhand is one of the states affected by Maoist activities. As of 2012, Chatra was one of the 14 highly affected districts in the state. 5 persons were killed in Chatra district in 2012, but Maoist activities, such as arms training camps and organisation of ‘Jan Adalats’ (kangaroo courts) were on the decline. 
As of 2016, Chatra was identified as one of the 13 focus areas by the state police to check Maoist activities.

Geography

Kunda CD block is bounded by Pratappur CD block in the north, Chatra CD block in the east, Lawalong CD block in the south and Tarhasi CD block in Palamu district in the west.

Kunda CD block has an area of 285.08 km2.Kunda police station serves this block. The headquarters of Kunda CD block is at Kunda village.

There are 5 panchayats and 78 villages in Kunda CD block.

Gram panchayats of Kunda CD block/ panchayat samiti are: Kunda, Sikidag, Margada, Baudhadih and Nawada.

Demographics

Population
According to the 2011 Census of India, Kunda CD block had a total population of 30,018, all of which were rural. There were 15,427 (51%) males and 14,591 (49%) females. Population in the age range 0–6 years was 6,839. Scheduled Castes numbered 19,081 (63.57%) and Scheduled Tribes numbered 1,155 (3.85%).

Literacy
As per the 2011 census the total number of literate persons in Kunda CD block was 10,394 (44.84% of the population over 6 years) out of which males numbered 6,699 (56.16% of the male population over 6 years) and females numbered 3,695 (28.35% of the female population over 6 years). The gender disparity (the difference between female and male literacy rates) was 30.81%.

As per 2011 census, literacy in Chatra district was 60.18% Literacy in Jharkhand (for population over 7 years) was 66.41% in 2011. Literacy in India in 2011 was 74.04%.

See also – List of Jharkhand districts ranked by literacy rate

Language and religion
According to the District Census Handbook, Chatra, 2011 census, as of 2001, among the different mother tongues (languages mentioned under 8th Schedule of Constitution of India), Hindi was spoken by 703,337 persons forming 88.87% of the population of Chatra district, followed by Urdu  68,301 persons (8.63%), Oraon 11,115 persons (1.40%) and other languages (with no details) 8,681 (1.10%). The population of the Scheduled Tribes in the district of Chatra during 2011 Census was 45,563 constituting 4.36 percent of the total population of the district.

Hindi is the official language in Jharkhand and Urdu has been declared as an additional official language.

According to the District Census Handbook, Chatra, 2011 census, Hindus numbered 903,179 and formed 86.60% of the population of Chatra district, followed by Muslims 116,710 (11.19%).

Rural poverty
Total number of BPL households in Kunda CD block in 2002-2007 was 4,222. According to 2011 census, number of households in Kunda CD block was 5,782. Rural poverty in Jharkhand declined from 66% in 1993–94 to 46% in 2004–05. In 2011, it has come down to 39.1%.

Economy

Livelihood

In Kunda CD block in 2011, amongst the class of total workers, cultivators numbered 3,131 and formed 22.30%, agricultural labourers numbered 9,040 and formed 64.39%, household industry workers numbered 918 and formed 6.54% and other workers numbered 951 and formed 6.77%. Total workers numbered 14,040 and formed 46.77% of the total population, and non-workers numbered 15,978 and formed 53.23% of the population.

Infrastructure
There are 76 inhabited villages in  Kunda CD block. In 2011, no village had power supply. 73 villages had well water (covered/ uncovered), 75 villages had hand pumps, and all villageshad drinking water facility. 9 villages had post offices, 1 village had sub post offices, 5 villages had telephones (land lines), 8 villages had mobile phone coverage. 75 villages had pucca (paved) village roads,  12 villages had bus service (public/ private), 6 villages had autos/ modified autos, 14 villages had taxi/vans and 64 villages had tractors. 5 villages had bank branches, 13 villages had agricultural credit societies, 3 villages had cinema/ video halls, 3 village had public library and public reading room. 18 villages had public distribution system, 5 villages had weekly haat (market) and 9 villages had assembly polling stations.

Agriculture
Chatra is a predominantly forest district with 65% of the land area being covered with forests. The balance 35% of the area has both rocky and alluvial soil. Alluvial soil is found mostly near river valleys. Rice is the main crop of the district. Other important crops grown are bajra, maize and pulses (mainly arhar and gram).

Tourism
The ruins of old Kunda palace/ fort can still be seen in a dilapidated condition some 3–4 miles from the present Kunda village. It was possibly built in the late 17th/ early 18th century. Of particular interest to tourists is an intriguing cave, half a mile from the old palace.  Every year on 14th  Phalguna/ Maha Shivaratri, there is a large gathering.

Backward Regions Grant Fund
Chatra district is listed as a backward region and receives financial support from the Backward Regions Grant Fund.  The fund created by the Government of India is designed to redress regional imbalances in development. As of 2012, 272 districts across the country were listed under this scheme. The list includes 21 districts of Jharkhand.

Education
According to the District Census Handbook, Chatra, 2011 census, Kunda CD block had 32 villages with pre-primary schools, 56 villages with primary schools, 16 villages with middle schools, 8 villages with secondary schools, 6 villages with senior secondary schools, 14 villages with no educational facility.
.*Note: Senior secondary schools are also known as Inter colleges in Jharkhand

Healthcare
According to the District Census Handbook, Chatra, 2011 census, Kunda CD block had 1 village with primary health centre, 1 village with primary health subcentre, 1 village with maternity and child welfare centre, 1 village with allopathic hospital, 1 village with dispensary, 1 village with family welfare centre.
.*Note: Private medical practitioners, alternative medicine etc. not included

References

Community development blocks in Chatra district